John Richards (born October 27, 1948) is a former American racing driver from Waco, Texas.  A former motorcycle racer, Richards switched to racing cars and competed in the US Formula Super Vee championship in 1984 and finished 10th.  In 1987 he funded a series of road course drives in the CART Championship Car series with Dick Simon Racing.  He was knocked out by a practice crash in what was to have been his debut at Portland International Raceway, but competed at The Meadowlands, Cleveland, Toronto, and Laguna Seca Raceway and finished both the Cleveland and Laguna Seca races in the 13th position, one spot out of the points.  He now lives in Seeley Lake, Montana.

References

1948 births
Champ Car drivers
SCCA Formula Super Vee drivers
Living people
Sportspeople from Waco, Texas
Racing drivers from Texas